.pf is the Internet country code top-level domain (ccTLD) for French Polynesia.

A local contact has to be appointed to register a domain name under .pf. The only 2nd level domain available for public registrations at the third level is .org.pf, but most registrations are made directly at the second level.

Second-level domains 

 org.pf
 asso.pf (reserved for duly declared associations)
 edu.pf (reserved for educational institutions)
 gov.pf (reserved for the Government of French Polynesia)

See also 
 Internet in French Polynesia
 Internet in France
 ISO 3166-2:PF
 .fr –CC TLD for the Republic of France
 .eu –CC TLD for the European Union

External links 
 
 IANA .pf whois information
 .pf registration rules (in French only)
 .pf domain application form

Country code top-level domains
Communications in French Polynesia

sv:Toppdomän#P